Andrey Alekseevich Sokolov (born August 13, 1962, Moscow) is a Soviet and Russian actor, film and theater director, TV presenter, producer, public figure. People's Artist of the Russian Federation (2005).

Selected filmography
 1987 — She with a Broom, He in a Black Hat as Alexey Orlov, young doctor
 1988 —  Little Vera as Sergei Sokolov
 1989 — How Dark the Nights Are on the Black Sea as Borya
 1990 — The Executioner as Andrey Arsentyev
 1991 — Tsar Ivan the Terrible as Vyazemsky
 1993 — Prediction as Oleg Goryunov in his youth
 1993 — The Secret of Queen Anne or Musketeers Thirty Years After as Raul, Viconte de Bragelonne, son of Athos
 2007 — I'm Staying as Gleb Shahov
 2022 — Amanat as Emperor Nicholas I

References

External links
 

1962 births
Living people
Soviet male film actors
Soviet male television actors
Soviet male stage actors
Russian male film actors
Russian male television actors
Russian male stage actors
20th-century Russian male actors
21st-century Russian male actors
Male actors from Moscow
Russian film producers
Honored Artists of the Russian Federation
People's Artists of Russia
Russian television presenters
High Courses for Scriptwriters and Film Directors alumni